The 2015–16 Greek Handball Premier is the 37th season of the Greek Handball Premier.

Teams

The clubs for the 2015–16 season:

Regular season

Pld – Played; W – Won; D – Drawn; L – Lost; GF – Goals for; GA – Goals against; Diff – Difference; Pts – Points.

Second round
In the second round, the teams were divided into two groups of six (based on their regular season standings) and competed for places 1 to 6 in the first group, and for places 7 to 12 in the second.

Teams started the second round with their regular season points halved (and rounded up) and faced each other once.

In the 1–6 group, the teams started with the following points: Diomidis 20 points, Filippos 18, PAOK 16, DIKEAS Nea Ionia 14, Poseidon Loutrakiou 12, ASE Douka 11.

In the 7–12 group, the teams started with the following points: Aeropos Edessas 10, AEK 10, Panellinios 9, Foivos Sykeon 8, YMCA Thessaloniki 6, Archelaos Katerinis 0.

Standings

Archelaos Katerinis withdrew.

Pld – Played; W – Won; D – Drawn; L – Lost; GF – Goals for; GA – Goals against; Diff – Difference; Pts – Points.

Finals

External links
Official website 

Handball in Greece
2015–16 domestic handball leagues
2015 in Greek sport
2016 in Greek sport